is a professional Japanese baseball player. He plays pitcher for the Yokohama DeNA BayStars.

External links

 NPB.com

1990 births
Living people
Hosei University alumni
Japanese baseball players
Nippon Professional Baseball pitchers
Yokohama DeNA BayStars players
Baseball people from Fukuoka (city)